Acacia disticha is a shrub belonging to the genus Acacia and the subgenus Phyllodineae. It is native to an area in the Goldfields-Esperance and Great Southern regions of Western Australia.

It blooms from September to February and produces cream flowers.

See also
 List of Acacia species

References

disticha
Acacias of Western Australia
Taxa named by Bruce Maslin